Conrad James Poole (born 12 February 1967) is a South African politician who is currently serving as the Mayor of the Drakenstein Local Municipality. He previously served as the Deputy Mayor of Drakenstein.  He is a member of the Democratic Alliance.

Early life and education
Conrad James Poole was born on 12 February 1967 in Paarl. He completed his primary school education at L.K. Zeeman Primary School and his secondary school education at Paulus Joubert Senior Secondary School.
 
Poole obtained his Cum Laude Diploma from the Paarl Bible School in 2010. He is currently fulfilling his second-year course. Poole was first employed by Berg River Textiles, due to his family having financial issues. He became a shop steward for the Southern African Clothing and Textile Workers Union, and he was soon promoted to the post of supervisor.

Political career
In 2007, he was elected a ward councillor for the Independent Democrats. As a member of the Independent Democrats, he served as chairperson in all three (municipal, provincial and national) of the party's political structures. He has received several awards from the Independent Democrats. He joined the Democratic Alliance in 2010, and the party appointed him as Drakenstein constituency chair.

In 2011, he was elected Deputy Mayor of the Drakenstein Local Municipality. He served alongside Mayor Gesie van Deventer until Van Deventer resigned in 2016 to accept the position of Mayor of Stellenbosch Local Municipality. Poole served as acting Mayor from 11 May 2016 until he was officially elected and sworn in as Mayor on 16 May 2016 at a special council meeting at the Huguenot Community Hall. Gert Combrink succeeded him as Deputy Mayor.

In August 2016, he won re-election as Mayor of the Drakenstein Local Municipality as the Democratic Alliance increased its seat total in the municipality.

Poole was elected to the DA's provincial executive committee as an additional member.

On 3 September 2021, Poole was nominated as the DA's mayoral candidate for the Drakenstein for a second term ahead of the election on 1 November. The DA retained control of the municipality, with a decrease in support. On 15 November 2021, Poole was re-elected as mayor.

Personal life
Poole married Jené Poole in 1990. The couple has three children and one grandchild. On 13 April 2019, Poole suffered a stroke.

References

1967 births
Cape Coloureds
Democratic Alliance (South Africa) politicians
Living people
People from Paarl